The crested chameleon, Trioceros cristatus,  is a species of chameleon  endemic to Africa. The species was first described by Samuel Stutchbury in 1837.

Distribution and habitat 
The crested chameleon can be found in Bioko, the Republic of Equatorial Guinea, the Republic of Cameroon, the Central African Republic, the Democratic Republic of the Congo, the Republic of the Congo, the Gabonese Republic, the Federal Republic of Nigeria, the Republic of Ghana and the République Togolaise (Republic Togo). It has a geological type locality of the Gabonese Republic. The IUCN (IUCN) have classed Trioceros cristatus as Least Concern.

Description 
The female is larger than the male. Females lay between 11 and 14 eggs, although a clutch of 37 was once found.

Taxonomy 
The crested chameleon was first described by Stutchbury in 1837. In 1865, Gray described it as the Pterosaurus cristatus. Werner described it as the Chamaeleon cristatus in 1911, and Mertens described it in 1966 as Chamaeleo cristatus. Klaver and Böhme described it as Chamaeleo (Trioceros) cristatus in 1986, and Necas described it under the same name in 1999. The species was most recently described by Tilbury and Tolley in 2009 as Trioceros cristatus.

References 

Trioceros
Reptiles described in 1837
Taxa named by Samuel Stutchbury